Amine Ahouda (born 11 September 1997) is a Moroccan tennis player.

Ahouda has a career high ATP singles ranking of No. 668 achieved on 19 June 2017. He has a career high ATP doubles ranking of No. 882 achieved on 29 October 2018.

In April 2016 he received a wild card for the singles and doubles main draw of the ATP Grand Prix Hassan II in Marrakesh, Morocco. He made his debut against Thiemo de Bakker in the singles draw, and alongside Yassine Idmbarek, he played against the #2 seed Marc López and David Marrero.

His first ATP career win came against the #8 seed Marcel Granollers at the 2017 Grand Prix Hassan II.

Ahouda has represented Morocco at Davis Cup, where he has a win–loss record of 7–3.

Medal matches

Singles: 2

Doubles: 1 (1 Bronze medal)

Future and Challenger finals

Singles: 1 (0–1)

Doubles 4 (2–2)

Davis Cup

Participations: (8–6)

   indicates the outcome of the Davis Cup match followed by the score, date, place of event, the zonal classification and its phase, and the court surface.

References

External links
 
 
 

1997 births
Living people
Moroccan male tennis players
Sportspeople from Casablanca
Competitors at the 2018 Mediterranean Games
Mediterranean Games competitors for Morocco
Islamic Solidarity Games competitors for Morocco
Islamic Solidarity Games medalists in tennis
21st-century Moroccan people